The 2023 Lower Austrian state election was held on 29 January 2023 to elect the members of the Landtag of Lower Austria. 

The ruling conservative ÖVP lost almost 10% of the vote and received slightly less than 40% of the vote, their worst election result ever. As a result, the party also lost its absolute majority in the Landtag of Lower Austria (23 of 56 seats, -9), as well as their absolute majority in the state government - losing 2 of their 6 state councilors. The party will retain 4 of the 9 state councilors.

The center-left SPÖ also had its worst election result ever, losing more than 3% and receiving 20.7% of the vote. They lost 1 seat in the Landtag, but kept their 2 state councilors. For the first time since World War II, the SPÖ ended up in third place in a Lower Austrian state election.

The far-right, populist FPÖ received its best election result ever, winning more than 24% of the vote, an increase of almost 10%. Their seat share in the Landtag increased by 6, to 14 seats. They won 2 additional state councilors, for a total of 3. For the first time ever, they overtook the SPÖ and became the 2nd-largest party in Lower Austria.

The environmentalist Greens improved their election results slightly, winning about 8% of the vote, up by just over 1%. They gained an additional seat in the Landtag and regained their parliamentary group status by winning a 4th seat again.

The liberal NEOS also improved their previous election result by more than 1% and received 6.7%, their best result ever and kept their 3 seats in the Landtag.

Both the Greens and NEOS failed to get one of the 9 state government councilors.

Voter turnout was 71.6%, an increase of 5% from the previous election, reversing a longtime trend of falling turnout.

Background
The Lower Austrian constitution mandates that cabinet positions in the state government (state councillors) be allocated between parties proportionally in accordance with the share of votes won by each; this is known as Proporz. As such, the government is a perpetual coalition of all parties that qualify for at least one state councillor. After the 2018 election, the ÖVP had six councillors, the SPÖ two, and the FPÖ one. A party has to win at least 10 to 12 percent of the vote to receive one of the nine state councillors.

Electoral system
The 56 seats of the Landtag of Lower Austria are elected via open list proportional representation in a two-step process. The seats are distributed between twenty multi-member constituencies. For parties to receive any representation in the Landtag, they must either win at least one seat in a constituency directly, or clear a 4 percent state-wide electoral threshold. Seats are distributed in constituencies according to the Hare quota, with any remaining seats allocated using the D'Hondt method at the state level, to ensure overall proportionality between a party's vote share and its share of seats.

Contesting parties
The table below lists parties represented in the previous Landtag.

Parties not currently represented in the state parliament of Lower Austria had until 23 December 2022 to submit the necessary signatures and paperwork to gain ballot access, either in individual constituencies or statewide.

In addition to the 5 parties represented in the state parliament, all of which are on the ballot statewide, another 3 parties gained ballot access:

 MFG Austria – People Freedom Fundamental Rights: (only in 5/20 constituencies: Baden, Krems, Mödling, St. Pölten and Tulln)
 KPÖ Plus – offene Liste: (only in 4/20 constituencies: Amstetten, Bruck an der Leitha, St. Pölten and Wiener Neustadt)
 ZIEL - Dein Ziel: (only in 1/20 constituencies: Amstetten)

Campaign
After the Austrian ÖVP-led federal government vetoed Romania and Bulgaria's accession to the Schengen Area, it was accused of having done so out of fear of losing seats in the Lower Austrian state election, with the FPÖ rising in opinion polls.

Opinion polling

Results

Results by constituency

Aftermath

After the election, the SPÖ replaced their party leader Franz Schnabl with Sven Hergovich - the current Lower Austrian leader of the Austrian Labor Market Service for the unemployed (AMS). 

Due to the Proporz system in Lower Austria, the ÖVP now gets 4 of the 9 state government councilors, the FPÖ 3 and the SPÖ 2. 

Official talks between the ÖVP and the other parties to create a possible coalition or working agreement in the newly elected Landtag started right after the election. 

A widely-perceived racist slur by FPÖ state councilor Gottfried Waldhäusl at a TV debate with high school students made a formal working agreement or coalition between the ÖVP and FPÖ unlikely - increasing instead the likelihood of a formal ÖVP-SPÖ working agreement or coalition in the Landtag. The widely-perceived racist slur by FPÖ state councilor Gottfried Waldhäusl was followed by a propaganda attack on the school of the students who participated in the TV debate with Waldhäusl, with unknown perpetrators dropping xenophobic leaflets and posters on the school grounds. Waldhäusl's comments and the xenophobic attack on the school prompted all other parties to sharply condemn Waldhäusl and the FPÖ. Meanwhile, the FPÖ either defended Waldhäusl or remained silent. Erwin Angerer, FPÖ lead candidate for the upcoming 2023 Carinthian state election on 5 March, said that he wouldn't have phrased Waldhäusl's comments the way he did, distancing himself somewhat from his party colleague. The FPÖ's general secretary Michael Schnedlitz, as well as party leader Herbert Kickl defended Waldhäusl's comments, while the FPÖ-leaders of Upper Austria, Tyrol and Salzburg were critical, saying "well-integrated high school students with a migrant background are the wrong target for failed immigration policy". Salzburg, like Carinthia, will vote later this year in the 2023 Salzburg state election on 23 April. 

On 14 February 2023, the ÖVP started in-depth coalition talks with the SPÖ.

On 9 March 2023, coalition talks between ÖVP and SPÖ were abruptly ended by the ÖVP after "unbridgeable differences", as well as "demands from the SPÖ that couldn't be agreed on". The new SPÖ-leader Sven Hergovich said "he would rather chop off his hand, than give in to the ÖVP". The SPÖ's demands included the introduction of all-day kindergarten care in Lower Austria, a statewide "job guarantee" for long-term unemployed, more heating benefits for poor people, better financial assistance for family members who perform long-term care for their ill/old family members and more investments into rural areas. The ÖVP said these demands would hurt the competitiveness of Lower Austria. The ÖVP will start in-depth talks with the FPÖ now about a possible coalition.

On 17 March, the new ÖVP-FPÖ coalition in the Lower Austrian state parliament (Landtag) was officially presented.

References

Elections in Austria
2023 elections in Austria
State elections in Austria
Lower Austria